František Okoličáni (born 26 September 1982 in Dolný Kubín) is a Slovak football goalkeeper who recently played for the Slovak Corgoň Liga club MFK Ružomberok.

References

External links
at mfkruzomberok.sk 

1982 births
Living people
Slovak footballers
Association football goalkeepers
MFK Dolný Kubín players
MFK Ružomberok players
Slovak Super Liga players
People from Dolný Kubín
Sportspeople from the Žilina Region